The 2014 Tashkent Open was a WTA International tennis tournament played on outdoor hard courts. It was the 16th edition of the Tashkent Open, on the 2014 WTA Tour. It took place at the Tashkent Tennis Center in Tashkent, Uzbekistan, between September 8–13, 2014.

Points and prize money

Point distribution

Prize money

1 Qualifiers prize money is also the Round of 32 prize money
* per team

Singles main-draw entrants 

 1 Rankings as of August 25, 2014

Other entrants 
The following players received wildcards into the singles main draw:
  Nigina Abduraimova
  Akgul Amanmuradova
  Jeļena Ostapenko

The following players received entry from the qualifying draw:
  Margarita Gasparyan
  Lyudmyla Kichenok
  Lesia Tsurenko
  Maryna Zanevska

The following player received entry by a protected ranking:
  Kateryna Bondarenko

Withdrawals 
Before the tournament
  Stefanie Vögele → replaced by  Kateryna Kozlova

Doubles main-draw entrants

Seeds 

1 Rankings as of August 25, 2014

Other entrants 
The following pairs received wildcards into the doubles main draw:
  Vlada Ekshibarova /  Arina Folts
  Jovana Jakšić /  Sabina Sharipova

Champions

Singles 

  Karin Knapp def.  Bojana Jovanovski, 6–2, 7–6(7–4)

Doubles 

  Aleksandra Krunić /  Kateřina Siniaková def.  Margarita Gasparyan /  Alexandra Panova, 6–2, 6–1

External links 
 Official website

 
Tashkent Open
2014
Tashkent Open
Tashkent Open